Dilara Fındıkoğlu (born September 5, 1990), commonly anglicized Dilara Findikoglu, is a Turkish-British fashion designer. Fındıkoğlu helped stage #encoreCSM, a guerrilla show for Central Saint Martins design students who weren't accepted to the school's highly coveted graduate press show and became renowned. Later, she began her London-based Dilara Findikoglu fashion brand in 2015. Since then, Bella Hadid, Lady Gaga, Madonna, or FKA Twigs are some of the names that have dressed her creations in red carpets and stages. She is known for her all-red rebellious and punk-fuelled gothic designs.

References

External links 
 

1990 births
Turkish fashion designers
Turkish women fashion designers
Living people
British people of Turkish descent